Helen Moody successfully defended her title, defeating Elizabeth Ryan in the final, 6–2, 6–2 to win the ladies' singles tennis title at the 1930 Wimbledon Championships.

Seeds

  Helen Moody (champion)
  Phoebe Watson (withdrew due to illness)
  Helen Jacobs (quarterfinals)
  Lili de Álvarez (withdrew due to illness) 
  Simonne Mathieu (semifinals)
  Cilly Aussem (semifinals)
  Phyllis Mudford (quarterfinals)
  Elizabeth Ryan (final)

Draw

Finals

Top half

Section 1

Section 2

Section 3

Section 4

Bottom half

Section 5

Section 6

Section 7

Section 8

References

External links

Women's Singles
Wimbledon Championship by year – Women's singles
Wimbledon Championships - singles
Wimbledon Championships - singles